Events from the year 1594 in art.

Events
Hendrick de Clerck becomes court painter to Archduke Ernest of Austria.

Paintings

Caravaggio
The Cardsharps
The Fortune Teller
Ludovico Carracci – Transfiguration
Marcus Gheeraerts the Younger – Captain Thomas Lee
Tommaso Laureti – Frescos in Palazzo dei Conservatori, Rome (1587–94)
Tintoretto – The Last Supper (fresco in San Giorgio Maggiore, Venice, 1592–94)
Second School of Fontainebleau – Gabrielle d'Estrées and one of her sisters (Louvre, Paris)

Sculpture
Black Christ of Esquipulas

Births
March 25 - Maria Tesselschade Visscher, Dutch poet and engraver (died 1649)
June 15 - Nicolas Poussin, French painter in the classical style (died 1665)
July 10 - Bartolomeo Gennari, Italian Renaissance painter (died 1661)
December - Jacob Gerritsz Cuyp, Dutch portrait and landscape painter (died 1652)
December 14 - Willem Claeszoon Heda, Dutch artist devoted exclusively to the painting of still life (died 1680)
date unknown
Charles Audran, French engraver (died 1674)
Giovanni Battista Barca, Italian painter (died 1650)
Peter Oliver, English miniaturist (died 1648)
Clara Peeters, Flemish still life painter (died c.1657)
Carlo Ridolfi, Italian art biographer and painter (died 1658)
Cornelis van Poelenburgh, Dutch painter (died 1667)

Deaths
May 31 – Tintoretto (real name Jacopo Comin) Italian painter of the Venetian school and probably the last great painter of the Italian Renaissance (born 1518) 
date unknown
Cristóvão Lopes, Portuguese portrait and altarpiece painter (born 1516)
Francisco Venegas, Spanish painter active in Portugal (born 1525)

 
Years of the 16th century in art